Acraea rohlfsi is a butterfly in the family Nymphalidae. It is found in northern Tanzania. Acraea rohlfsi is very similar to Acraea petraea qv. It is a member of the Acraea cepheus species group, but see also Pierre & Bernaud, 2014.

References

Butterflies described in 1904
rohlfsi
Endemic fauna of Tanzania
Butterflies of Africa